Bulhac may refer to several places in Moldova:

Bulhac, a village in Șumna Commune, Rîșcani District
Bulhac, a village in Cioropcani Commune, Ungheni District